Saint George's Cathedral is the cathedral of the Roman Catholic Diocese of Syros and Milos. It is located in the town of Ano Syros, on the island of Syros, Greece.

History

The church was built on top of a hill about 1200. Several times the temple was rebuilt. In 1617, it was destroyed by the Turks. Since 1652 the church became the cathedral of the Roman Catholic Diocese of Syros and Milos. In 1834, the last time was rebuilt and since then has a modern look. In the church there are the icon of Saint George and the icon of the Mother of God "Panagias tis Elpidas" of artistic and cultural value. The church has also a portrait of Bishop Ioannis Andreas Kargas, who was hanged by the Turks.

External links
 http://www.greeka.com/cyclades/syros/syros-churches.htm

George
Buildings and structures in Syros